Georg Jauss (15 March 1867, in Hattenhofen – 6 March 1922, in Munich) was a German landscape painter who worked in Bavaria.

Life 
Jauss was the eldest of six children born to Anna Maria and Leonhard Jauss (a mason and farmer). From 1873 to 1880, he attended the elementary school in Hattenhofen, where the Pastor discovered that he had talent for drawing and arranged for him to take lessons at Göppingen. In 1883, he became a fellow at the Academy of Fine Arts and Design in Stuttgart. Jakob Grünenwald was one of his instructors; his fellow students included Christian Landenberger and Bernhard Buttersack.

He took a study trip to Italy in the summer of 1890 and, after his military service, went to the Dachau District where his interests changed from genre painting to landscapes. In 1895, he became a teacher at the Munich Association of Women Artists and joined the Munich Secession but, only four years later, resigned Association and disassociated himself from the Secession. From 1906 to 1913, he was a member of the Luitpold Group, an association of slightly modernist tendencies that promoted high-quality art, then he returned to the Secession.

He was married twice and had two children. In 1919, he became a naturalized citizen of Bavaria. He died of a stroke and is buried in the Old North Cemetery, Munich.

References

Sources and further reading 
Jauss, J. und Dr. Best, B.: Georg Jauss 1867-1922, Landschaftsmaler der Jahrhundertwende in Bayern. Dachau 2010, 
Thieme, Becker: Künstlerlexikon (Allgemeines Lexikon der bildenden Künstler), Verlag W. Engelmann, 1907-1947, Leipzig
Nagel G.K.: Schwäbisches Künstlerlexikon. K & A, Stuttgart 1986
Thiemann, C.: Erinnerungen eines Dachauer Malers, Dachau 1967
Reitmeier, L.J.: Dachau, ein Kunstbilderbuch. Dachau 1995
Walter E.: Hattenhofer Bilderbogen. Gemeindeverwaltung Hattenhofen, 1984
Frei, W.: "Malerisches Erbe zwischen Isar und Loisach", Hirmer, 2018

External links 

Dachau Tourism: Artists' House of Georg Jauss
Merkur: Museumsverein rückt Georg Jauss ins rechte Licht

1867 births
1922 deaths
Landscape painters
19th-century German painters
19th-century German male artists
German male painters
20th-century German painters
20th-century German male artists